Desi hip hop is a term for music and culture which combines the influences of hip hop and the Indian subcontinent; the term desi referring to the South Asian diaspora. The term has also come to be used as an alternative for rap music and even pop music which involves rappers of South Asian origins.

Overview 
The launch of Bohemia's second album Pesa Nasha Pyar (2006), whose tracks such as "Kali Denali", "Kurti" and "Sahara" became big hits, there was a new-found interest in desi languages during the early 2000s. Even though there were several occasional hits during this period, the desi hip hop scene remained limited largely to the underground, with a very niche loyal audience. Hip-hop culture, including graffiti and b-boying started seeping into the club scene and street culture of big cities like Delhi and Mumbai.

Also, 2017 saw a major boost in this genre through the start of Rap battle culture introduced by an entertainment and music production house named 6FU. Rap battles are a culture of western countries, however India witnessed its first rap battle in regional languages through 6FU's first event Frontline in Delhi. The label started youtube channel in 2017 has given under grounder rappers a new hope to be heard and establish rap as a career. 6FU was started by Trouble who hosts rap battles and cypher (freestyling) sessions where more than a dozen rappers perform turn-by-turn on the same stage to see who has the better verses.

Collaborations
Desi hip hop has crossed paths with Western hip-hop multiple times, notably when musicians from both sides of the world collaborate. American rapper Snoop Dogg has worked with different artists such as rapper Dr Zeus Bohemia (rapper), and the band RDB. Bohemia also collaborated with hip-hop artists such as Kurupt, Sean Kingston, Iraj Weeraratne and Baby Bash & The Game (rapper). The group RDB also worked with different hip hop artists such as T-Pain and Ludacris. In 2016, famous Indian rapper Badshah worked with dancehall musician Sean Paul in a song called "Move Your Body" with DJ Shadow Dubai. Desi rappers born and/or raised in the West have also bridged the cultures within their music, incorporating desi influences into their music. Anik Khan has blended Queens culture with Bengali influences into his music, and similarly, rappers Riz MC and Heems of the group Swet Shop Boys incorporate many South Asian influences in their music. In 2017, Pakistani rapper Ali Kaz collaborated with WWE music producer Jim Johnston for the theme song of WWE wrestler Jinder Mahal. In 2017, Badshah also did international collaboration with Major Lazer as a commercial promotion of Tuborg Brewery.

In 2017, Los Angeles based Hip Hop group - Bhanga Bangla - introduced a type of Trap music that leans heavily on South Asian stories from the trap. They went on to create a new trap movement that has sparked the attention of audiences around the world. In 2019, Divine and Naezy collaborated with American rapper Nas. In the same year Divine collaborated with Dave East for his song Remand. The same year Emiway Bantai collaborated with Nigerian Canadian rapper Dax for their song I Been That. In 2020, Emiway Bantai collaborated with the likes of Macklemore and Snoop Dogg. In January 2021, KR$NA was featured on American rapper Hi-Rez's song "Crossroads" with Royce da 5'9". Later in July, another collaboration with Hi-Rez was released, titled "Playground" featuring former Slaughterhouse member, KXNG Crooked. In the same year in November, KR$NA was featured along with A-F-R-O, Joell Ortiz, Bizzy Bone, Tech N9ne and Twista, on the song "Overdrive", by Hi-Rez.

In 2022, Rapper Badshah announced that he's collaborating with Colombian singer J Balvin and Puerto Rican record producer Tainy in a song called Voodoo.While in July 2022, DJ Shadow Dubai, a dubai based DJ announced collab with Yo Yo Honey Singh and Lil Pump for track called Casanova. In August 2022, Emiway Bantai collaborated with Detroit based Pakistani rapper Lazarus for track called LOBOTOMY.

References 

Desi culture
Asian hip hop
Asian-American culture
Asian-Canadian culture
British culture